Mike Bernskoetter (born November 29, 1959) is an American politician. A Republican, he is a member of the Missouri Senate, having served since 2019. Bernskoetter is a former member of the Missouri House of Representatives, and served from 2011 to 2019. In 2018, Bernskoetter was elected to succeed Mike Kehoe as the state senator representing Missouri's 6th district; Kehoe was appointed lieutenant governor in June 2018.

Electoral history

State Representative

State Senate

References

1959 births
21st-century American politicians
Living people
Republican Party Missouri state senators
Republican Party members of the Missouri House of Representatives